Home study or homestudy may refer to:
Adoption home study, an examination of prospective parents and their home prior to allowing them to adopt
Home study course, distance learning
Home study lesson, Rosicrucian Monographs
Homeschooling
"Home Study" Courses in Traffic school